Pseuduraecha punctiventris is a species of beetle in the family Cerambycidae. It was described by Heller in 1926.

References

Lamiini
Beetles described in 1926